Medwyn John "Med" Evans (born 8 November 1964) is a Welsh former professional footballer who played as a midfielder. He made appearances in the English Football League with Wrexham.

He also played in the Welsh leagues for Bangor City, Bethesda Athletic, Glantraeth, Bodedern Athletic and Llannerch-y-medd, the latter of which he went on to be an assistant manager at.

Personal life
Evans had two sons, Chris and Deion. Chris was an apprentice at Wrexham and played for Bangor City and Llannerch-y-medd. and Deion was an apprentice at Tranmere Rovers. Chris died in 2015 aged 27.

References

1964 births
Living people
Welsh footballers
Association football midfielders
Wrexham A.F.C. players
Bangor City F.C. players
Bethesda Athletic F.C. players
Glantraeth F.C. players
Bodedern Athletic F.C. players
English Football League players
Llanerchymedd F.C. players